Sulivan is a surname. Notable people with the surname include:

Bartholomew Sulivan (1810–1890), English sailor and hydrographer
Laurence Sulivan (1713–1786), British East India Company director and politician
Laurence Sulivan (1783–1866), Deputy Secretary at War, grandson of the above
Timothy Sulivan (born 1946), British Army general

See also
Lake Sulivan, a lake of the Falkland Islands
Mount Sulivan, a mountain of the Falkland Islands
Sullivan (disambiguation)